Boughanmi is a surname. Notable people with the surname include:

Maroua Boughanmi (born 1992), Tunisian volleyball player
Mohamed Boughanmi (born 1991), French rugby union player
Ossama Boughanmi (born 1990), Tunisian footballer
Oussama Boughanmi (born 1990), Tunisian handball player